The siege of Jajce took place between 10 July and 24 August 1464, during the Ottoman conquest of Bosnia and Herzegovina, when an Ottoman army under Sultan Mehmed II made a new attempt to retrieve Bosnia and conquer the strategic fortress of Jajce, south of Banjaluka. Despite massive bombardment, the final Ottoman assault was heavily repulsed and after hearing that King Mathias of Hungary was approaching with a relief army, Mehmed abandoned the siege.

Battle
Jajce had been conquered by the Hungarians in December 1463, after a siege that followed Matthias Corvinus' offensive into Bosnia in late September 1463. It is said that Corvinus managed to take over sixty places in Bosnia, many of which were fortified. In July and August 1464, Sultan Mehmed II personally commanded the siege to take back Jajce. The Ottoman army had probably set out from Edirne in late May according to C. Imber, 'since Malipiero dates the siege of Jajce to between 10 July and 24 August, and Enveri [...] also says that it began in July'.

The main body of the Ottoman army reached Jajce on 10 July 1464. The Hungarian defense withstood the attack, as news of Corvinus' advance from the Sava reached the Ottoman army and forced Mehmed II to abandon baggage, throw his cannons into the river, and retreat to Sofia in August or September, where the army wintered.

Mehmed Bey Minnetoğlu was appointed the governor of Bosnia after this second siege of Jajce.

References

Sources

 

Conflicts in 1464
1464 in Europe
Jajce 1464
Jajce 1464
Ottoman period in the history of Bosnia and Herzegovina
History of Jajce